Guaraci or Quaraci (from Tupi kûarasý, "sun") in the Guaraní mythology is the god of the Sun, creator of all living creatures.

See also
 List of solar deities

Guaraní deities
Solar gods